The Dirty Dozen is a 1967 American war film directed by Robert Aldrich and starring Lee Marvin with an ensemble supporting cast including Ernest Borgnine, Charles Bronson, Jim Brown, John Cassavetes, Richard Jaeckel, George Kennedy, Ralph Meeker, Robert Ryan, Telly Savalas, Donald Sutherland, Clint Walker and Robert Webber. Set in 1944 during the Second World War, it was filmed in England at MGM-British Studios and released by MGM. The film was a box office success and won the Academy Award for Best Sound Editing at the 40th Academy Awards in 1968. In 2001, the American Film Institute placed it at number 65 on their 100 Years... 100 Thrills list. The screenplay is based on the 1965 bestseller by E. M. Nathanson which was inspired by a real-life WWII unit of behind-the-lines demolition specialists from the 101st Airborne Division named the "Filthy Thirteen". Another possible inspiration was the public offer to President Franklin D. Roosevelt by 44 prisoners serving life sentences at the Oklahoma State Penitentiary to serve in the Pacific on suicide missions against the Japanese.

Plot
In March 1944, OSS officer Major John Reisman is ordered by the commander of ADSEC in Britain, Major General Sam Worden, to undertake Project Amnesty, a top-secret mission to train some of the Army's worst prisoners and turn them into commandos to be sent on a virtual suicide mission just before D-Day. The target is a château near Rennes where dozens of high-ranking German officers will be eliminated in order to disrupt the chain of command of the Wehrmacht in Northern France before the Allied invasion. The prisoners who survive the mission will receive pardons for their crimes.

Five prisoners are condemned to death while the others face lengthy sentences which include hard labor. With a detachment of MPs led by Sgt. Bowren acting as guards, the prisoners gradually learn how to operate together when they are forced to build their own training camp. However, when an act of insubordination is instigated by the rebellious Franko, all shaving and wash kits are withheld as punishment which leads to their nickname "The Dirty Dozen." During their training the prisoners are psychoanalyzed by Capt. Kinder who warns Reisman that they would all quite likely kill him if given the chance; and rapist/killer Maggot is by far the most dangerous.

With their commando training almost complete, the "Dirty Dozen" are sent for parachute training at a facility commanded by Reisman's nemesis Colonel Everett Dasher Breed of the 101st Airborne Division. When Reisman's men run afoul of Breed, especially after Pinkley – under Reisman's orders – poses as a general to inspect Breed's best troops, the Airborne colonel attempts to discover Reisman's mission by having two of his men beat a confession out of one of the prisoners. The convicts blame Reisman for the attack but realize their mistake after Breed and his men arrive at their camp looking for answers. Reisman infiltrates his own camp and the convicts disarm Breed's paratroops forcing the colonel to leave in humiliation.

Upon the men's completion of their training, Reisman rewards them with prostitutes, which raises the ire of General Worden and his chief of staff, Brigadier General Denton. Termination of the project is considered, which would result in sending the men back to prison for execution of their sentences. However, Reisman ferociously defends the prisoners saying each one is worth ten of Breed's best troops. Reisman's friend, Major Max Armbruster, suggests a test. During upcoming military maneuvers in southwest England, the "Dirty Dozen" will attempt to capture Colonel Breed's headquarters. The unit successfully infiltrates and captures Breed's war games headquarters using various unorthodox tactics. An impressed General Worden green-lights Reisman's mission.

The men parachute into northern France, but Jiminez breaks his neck during the jump. With a man down, the mission proceeds with German-speaking Wladislaw and Reisman infiltrating the chateau disguised as German officers. Pinkley stands outside posing as a German officer. Gilpin is on the roof of the building, but his leg breaks through and gets stuck. However, all surprise is lost when the psychopathic Maggot breaks cover and sets off an alarm. Gilpin with his leg stuck in the roof sacrifices himself by blowing up the antenna with hand grenades. Pinkley shoots and kills several officers before he himself is gunned down. Maggot is then shot and killed by Jefferson to protect the mission. The sound of gunfire makes the Wehrmacht officers and their companions retreat to a locked underground bomb shelter, but after gasoline has been poured down ventilation shafts, Jefferson throws the hand grenades down the shafts and runs for his life but is shot dead. 

After extensive fighting, only Reisman, Sgt Bowren, and Wladislaw escape alive. Back in England, a voiceover from Armbruster confirms that General Worden exonerated the sole surviving member of the Dirty Dozen and communicated to the next of kin of the rest that "they lost their lives in the line of duty".

Cast

 Lee Marvin as Major John Reisman
 Ernest Borgnine as Major General Sam Worden
 Charles Bronson as Joseph Wladislaw (prisoner #9)
 Jim Brown as Robert T. Jefferson (#3)
 John Cassavetes as Victor R. Franko (#11)
 Richard Jaeckel as Sergeant Clyde Bowren
 George Kennedy as Major Max Armbruster
 Ralph Meeker as Captain Stuart Kinder
 Robert Ryan as Colonel Everett Dasher Breed
 Telly Savalas as Archer J. Maggot (#8)
 Donald Sutherland as Vernon L. Pinkley (#2)
 Clint Walker as Samson Posey (#1)
 Robert Webber as Brigadier General Denton
 Tom Busby as Milo Vladek (#6)
 Ben Carruthers as Glenn Gilpin (#4)
 Stuart Cooper as Roscoe Lever (#5)
 Trini López as Pedro Jiminez (#10)
 Colin Maitland as Seth K. Sawyer (#7)
 Al Mancini as Tassos R. Bravos (#12)
 Robert Phillips as Corporal Carl Morgan
 Dora Reisser as German officer's girl
 George Roubicek as Private Arthur James Gardner
 Thick Wilson as General Worden's aide
 Gerry Crampton Stunt Coordinator (uncredited)
 Ray Austin Ass Stunt Coordinator (uncredited)
 Hildegard Knef as undetermined (uncredited)
 Richard Marner as a German sentry (uncredited)
 John Hollis as German porter at château (uncredited)

Production

Writing 
Although Robert Aldrich had failed to buy the rights to E.M. Nathanson's novel The Dirty Dozen while it was just an outline, Metro-Goldwyn-Mayer succeeded in May 1963. On publication, the novel became a best-seller in 1965. It was adapted to the screen by veteran scriptwriter and producer Nunnally Johnson, and Lukas Heller. A repeated rhyme was written into the script where the twelve actors verbally recite the details of the attack in a rhyming chant to help them remember their roles while approaching the mission target:
 Down to the road block, we've just begun.
 The guards are through.
 The Major's men are on a spree.
 Major and Wladislaw go through the door.
 Pinkley stays out in the drive.
 The Major gives the rope a fix.
 Wladislaw throws the hook to heaven.
 Jiminez has got a date.
 The other guys go up the line.
 Sawyer and Gilpin are in the pen.
 Posey guards Points Five and Seven.
 Wladislaw and the Major go down to delve.
 Franko goes up without being seen.
 Zero Hour: Jiminez cuts the cable; Franko cuts the phone.
 Franko goes in where the others have been.
 We all come out like it's Halloween.

Casting 
The cast included many World War II US veterans including Lee Marvin, Robert Webber and Robert Ryan (US Marine Corps); Telly Savalas and George Kennedy (US Army); Charles Bronson (US Army Air Forces); Ernest Borgnine (US Navy); and Clint Walker (US Merchant Marine).

John Wayne was the original choice for Reisman, but he turned down the role because he objected to the adultery present in the original script, which featured the character having a relationship with an Englishwoman whose husband was fighting on the Continent. Jack Palance refused the "Archer Maggot" role when they would not rewrite the script to make his character lose his racism; Telly Savalas took the role instead.

Six of the dozen were experienced American stars, while the "Back Six" were actors resident in the UK, Englishman Colin Maitland, Canadians Donald Sutherland and Tom Busby, and Americans Stuart Cooper, Al Mancini, and Ben Carruthers. According to commentary on The Dirty Dozen: 2-Disc Special Edition, when Trini Lopez left the film early, the death scene of Lopez's character where he blew himself up with the radio tower was given to Busby (in the film, Ben Carruthers' character Glenn Gilpin is given the task of blowing up the radio tower while Busby's character Milo Vladek is shot in front of the château). Lopez's character dies off-camera during the parachute drop that begins the mission. The impersonation of the general scene was to have been done by Clint Walker, but when he thought the scene was demeaning to his character, who was a Native American, Aldrich picked out Sutherland for the bit.

Jim Brown, the Cleveland Browns running back, announced his retirement from American football at age thirty during the making of the film. The owner of the Browns, Art Modell, demanded Brown choose between football and acting. With Brown's considerable accomplishments in the sport (he was already the NFL's all-time leading rusher, was well ahead statistically of the second-leading rusher, and his team had won the 1964 NFL Championship), he chose acting. In Spike Lee's 2002 documentary Jim Brown: All-American Modell admitted he made a huge mistake in forcing Jim Brown to choose between football and Hollywood. He said that if he had it to do over again, he would never have made such a demand. Modell fined Jim Brown the equivalent of over $100 per day, a fine which Brown said that "today wouldn't even buy the doughnuts for a team".

Filming 

The production was filmed in the U.K. during the summer of 1966. Interiors and set pieces took place at MGM-British Studios, Borehamwood, where the château set was built under the direction of art director William Hutchinson. Construction of the faux château proved problematic. The script required its explosion, but it was so solid that 70 tons of explosives would have been required for the effect. Instead, a cork and plastic section was destroyed.

Exteriors were shot throughout southeast England. The credit scenes at the American military prison – alluded in the movie to be Shepton Mallett – were shot in a courtyard at Ashridge House in Hertfordshire. Co-star Richard Jaeckel recalled that when the introductory lineup scene was first shot, Aldrich, who liked to play pranks on his actors, initially placed  Charles Bronson between  Clint Walker and  Donald Sutherland, which provoked an angry response from the diminutive Bronson, making Aldrich laugh.

The jump school scene was shot at the former entrance to RAF Hendon in London. The wargame was filmed in and around the village of Aldbury. Bradenham Manor was the Wargames' Headquarters. Beechwood Park School in Markyate was also used as a location during the school's summer term, where the training camp and tower were built and shot in the grounds and the village itself as parts of "Devonshire". The main house was also used, appearing in the film as a military hospital. After filming finished, the training camp huts were relocated and used as sports equipment storage for the school's playing fields. Residents of Chenies, Buckinghamshire complained to MGM when filming caused damage around their village.

While making the film, some of the cast members gave an interview to ABC Film review, in which they contrasted their own real wartime ranks to their officer roles in the film:
George Kennedy: Took me two years to make Private First Class.Lee Marvin: I didn't even make that in the Marines.Ernest Borgnine: I was beneath notice in the NavyFor punks, we're doing all right, said Marvin. I wonder how the generals are doing?

Heavy rains throughout the summer caused filming delays of several months, leading to $1 million in overruns and bringing the final cost to $5 million. In the early hours of 21 September 1966 part of the Chateau set burned down prematurely. Night-time film had been stopped at 03:30 due to fog, and the set - which was due to be destroyed during filming - caught fire at 06:29.<ref>Hull Daily Mail', 21 September 1966, page 1</ref> Principal photography wrapped at MGM-British Studios in September 1966 with post-production to be completed at MGM studios in Culver City, California.

Historical authenticity
Nathanson states in the prologue to his novel The Dirty Dozen that, while he heard a legend that such a unit may have existed, he incorrectly heard that they were convicts. He was unable to find any corroboration in the archives of the US Army in Europe. He instead turned his research of convicted felons into the subsequent novel. He does not state where he acquired the name, but Arch Whitehouse coined the name "Dirty Dozen" as the 12 enlisted men of the airborne section that became the "Filthy Thirteen" after the lieutenant joined their ranks. In Arch Whitehouse's article in True Magazine, he claimed that all the enlisted men were full-blood Indians, but in reality only their leader Jake McNeice was one-quarter Choctaw. The parts of the Filthy Thirteen story that carried over into Nathanson's book were not bathing until the jump into Normandy, their disrespect for military authority, and the pre-invasion party. The Filthy Thirteen was actually a demolitions section with a mission to secure bridges over the Douve on D-Day.

A unit called the "Filthy Thirteen" was an airborne demolition unit documented in the eponymous book, and this unit's exploits inspired the fictional account. Barbara Maloney, the daughter of John Agnew, a private in the Filthy Thirteen, told the American Valor Quarterly that her father felt that 30 percent of the film's content was historically correct, including a scene where officers are captured. Unlike the Dirty Dozen, the Filthy Thirteen were not convicts; however, they were men prone to drinking and fighting and often spent time in the stockade.The Filthy Thirteen: The U.S. Army's Real "Dirty Dozen" American Valor Quarterly. Winter 2008–09. Retrieved April 10, 2010. 

Release
TheatricalThe Dirty Dozen premiered at the Capitol Theatre in New York City on June 15, 1967 and opened at the 34th Street East theatre the following day. Despite being shot in an aspect ratio of 1.85:1, the film was initially shown in 70 mm which cut off 15% of the film and resulted in a grainy look.

 Reception 
 Box office The Dirty Dozen was a massive commercial success. In its first five days in New York, the film grossed $103,849 from 2 theatres. Produced on a budget of $5.4 million, it earned theatrical rentals of $7.5 million in its first five weeks from 1,152 bookings and 625 prints, one of the fastest-grossing films at the time; however, on Variety's weekly box office survey, based on a sample of key city theatres, it only reached number two at the U.S. box office behind You Only Live Twice until it finally reached number one in its sixth week. It eventually earned rentals of $24.2 million in the United States and Canada from a gross of $45.3 million. It was the fourth-highest-grossing film of 1967 and MGM's highest-grossing film of the year. It was also a hit in France, with admissions of 4,672,628.

 Critical response 
Upon release, the film has granted positive reviews from critics. It holds an 81% rating on Rotten Tomatoes based on 52 reviews, with an average rating of 8.00/10. The critical consensus reads, "Amoral on the surface and exuding testosterone, The Dirty Dozen utilizes combat and its staggering cast of likable scoundrels to deliver raucous entertainment." On release, the film was criticized for its level of violence. Roger Ebert, who was in his first year as a film reviewer for the Chicago Sun-Times, wrote sarcastically:

I'm glad the Chicago Police Censor Board forgot about that part of the local censorship law where it says films shall not depict the burning of the human body. If you have to censor, stick to censoring sex, I say...but leave in the mutilation, leave in the sadism and by all means leave in the human beings burning to death. It's not obscene as long as they burn to death with their clothes on.

In another contemporaneous review, Bosley Crowther called it "an astonishingly wanton war film" and a "studied indulgence of sadism that is morbid and disgusting beyond words"; he also noted:

It is not simply that this violent picture of an American military venture is based on a fictional supposition that is silly and irresponsible. ... But to have this bunch of felons a totally incorrigible lot, some of them psychopathic, and to try to make us believe that they would be committed by any American general to carry out an exceedingly important raid that a regular commando group could do with equal efficiency—and certainly with greater dependability—is downright preposterous.

Crowther called some of the portrayals "bizarre and bold":

Marvin's taut, pugnacious playing of the major ... is tough and terrifying. John Cassavetes is wormy and noxious as a psychopath condemned to death, and Telly Savalas is swinish and maniacal as a religious fanatic and sex degenerate. Charles Bronson as an alienated murderer, Richard Jaeckel as a hard-boiled military policeman, and Jim Brown as a white-hating Negro stand out in the animalistic group.

Art Murphy of Variety was more positive, calling it "an exciting World War II pre-D-Day drama" with an "excellent cast" and a "very good screenplay" with "a ring of authenticity to it".

The Time Out Film Guide notes that over the years, "The Dirty Dozen has taken its place alongside that other commercial classic, The Magnificent Seven". The review then states:

The violence which liberal critics found so offensive has survived intact. Aldrich sets up dispensable characters with no past and no future, as Marvin reprieves a bunch of death row prisoners, forges them into a tough fighting unit, and leads them on a suicide mission into Nazi France. Apart from the values of team spirit, cudgeled by Marvin into his dropout group, Aldrich appears to be against everything: anti-military, anti-Establishment, anti-women, anti-religion, anti-culture, anti-life. Overriding such nihilism is the super-crudity of Aldrich's energy and his humour, sufficiently cynical to suggest that the whole thing is a game anyway, a spectacle that demands an audience.

 Accolades 

Year-end lists
Also, the film is recognized by American Film Institute in these lists:
 2001: AFI's 100 Years...100 Thrills – No. 65
 2003: AFI's 100 Years...100 Heroes & Villains:
 The Dirty Dozen – Nominated Heroes
 2006: AFI's 100 Years...100 Cheers – Nominated

Other media
Unofficial sequels and remake
Three years after The Dirty Dozen was released, Too Late the Hero, a film also directed by Aldrich, was described as a "kind of sequel to The Dirty Dozen". The 1969 Michael Caine film Play Dirty follows a similar theme of convicts recruited as soldiers. The 1977 Italian war film directed by Enzo G. Castellari, The Inglorious Bastards, is a loose remake of The Dirty Dozen. Quentin Tarantino's 2009 Inglourious Basterds was derived from the English-language title of the Castellari film.

Comic books
Dell Comics published a comic The Dirty Dozen in October 1967.

Sequels

Several TV films were produced in the mid-to-late 1980s which capitalized on the popularity of the first film. Lee Marvin, Richard Jaeckel and Ernest Borgnine reprised their roles for The Dirty Dozen: Next Mission in 1985, leading a group of military convicts in a mission to kill a German general who was plotting to assassinate Adolf Hitler. In The Dirty Dozen: The Deadly Mission (1987), Telly Savalas, who had played the role of the psychotic Maggot in the original film, assumed the different role of Major Wright, an officer who leads a group of military convicts to extract a group of German scientists who are being forced to make a deadly nerve gas. Ernest Borgnine again reprised his role of General Worden. The Dirty Dozen: The Fatal Mission (1988) depicts Savalas's Wright character and a group of renegade soldiers attempting to prevent a group of extreme German generals from starting a Fourth Reich, with Erik Estrada co-starring and Ernest Borgnine again playing the role of General Worden. In 1988, Fox aired a short-lived television series starring Ben Murphy. Among the cast was John Slattery, who played Private Leeds in eight of the show's 11 episodes.

Toys
Some of the surviving cast members of the original film provided the voices of the toy soldiers in Joe Dante's Small Soldiers.

In popular culture
In 2014, Warner Bros. announced that director David Ayer would be the director of a live-action adaptation of the DC Comics property Suicide Squad, and Ayer has gone on to say that the film is "the Dirty Dozen with super villains", citing the original film as inspiration. 

Remake
In December 2019 Warner Brothers announced it was developing a remake with David Ayer set to direct.

 See also 
 List of American films of 1967
 Silmido'', a 2003 Korean film about the true story to train convicts as black ops assassins in order to kill North Korean leader Kim Il Sung

References

External links 

 
 
 
 
 The Dirty Dozen - Behind the Scenes following Lee Marvin and the film's cast during their time in England

1967 films
1967 war films
1960s English-language films
American World War II films
British World War II films
Films about capital punishment
Films about the United States Army
Films adapted into comics
Films based on American novels
Films directed by Robert Aldrich
Films scored by Frank De Vol
Films set in 1944
Films set in France
Films shot at MGM-British Studios
Films that won the Best Sound Editing Academy Award
Films with screenplays by Nunnally Johnson
Metro-Goldwyn-Mayer films
Photoplay Awards film of the year winners
Western Front of World War II films
World War II films based on actual events
1960s American films
1960s British films